The Grammy Award for Best Música Urbana Album is an honor presented to recording artists for quality vocal or instrumental Latin urban albums at the Grammy Awards, a ceremony that was established in 1958 and originally called the Gramophone Awards. Honors in several categories are presented at the ceremony annually by the Recording Academy of the United States to "honor artistic achievement, technical proficiency and overall excellence in the recording industry, without regard to album sales or chart position". Bad Bunny was the inaugural winner of this category thanks to his 2020 album El Último Tour Del Mundo.

History
The award for Best Música Urbana Album, reserved for Latin performers exhibiting "Latin urban styles", was first presented at the 64th Annual Grammy Awards in April 2022. The award category is an addition to the Latin Music field, which also includes Best Regional Mexican Music Album (including Tejano), Best Latin Rock or Alternative Album, Best Tropical Latin Album, and Best Latin Pop Album.

Recipients

Artists with multiple wins
2 wins
 Bad Bunny (consecutive)

Artists with multiple nominations
2 nominations
 Bad Bunny
 Rauw Alejandro

See also
 Grammy Award for Best Latin Pop Album
 Grammy Award for Best Latin Rock or Alternative Album
 Grammy Award for Best Tropical Latin Album

References

External links
Official site of the Grammy Awards

2022 establishments in the United States
Album awards
Awards established in 2022
Música Urbana Album
Música Urbana Album